Peter Reichert (born 4 August 1961) is a German former professional footballer who played as a forward.

Honours 
VfB Stuttgart
 Bundesliga: 1983–84
 DFB-Pokal: runner-up 1985–86

References

External links
 
 

1961 births
Living people
People from Bretten
Sportspeople from Karlsruhe (region)
German footballers
West German footballers
Footballers from Baden-Württemberg
Association football forwards
Germany under-21 international footballers
Bundesliga players
Ligue 1 players
VfB Stuttgart players
VfB Stuttgart II players
RC Strasbourg Alsace players
Toulouse FC players
Karlsruher SC players
West German expatriate footballers
West German expatriate sportspeople in France
Expatriate footballers in France